Urotrema is a genus of flatworms belonging to the family Pleurogenidae.

The species of this genus are found in America.

Species:

Urotrema aelleni 
Urotrema lasiurensis
Urotrema minuta 
Urotrema scabridum

References

Platyhelminthes